Viraj Vilas Kadbe (born 19 November 1989) is an Indian cricketer. He was part of the Chennai Super Kings team in the Indian Premier League and for Vidharba in the Ranji Trophy.

Career
Kadbe has a batting average of 24.00
He made his list a debut against Rajasthan.

References

Chennai Super Kings cricketers
Indian cricketers
Vidarbha cricketers
1989 births
Living people
Place of birth missing (living people)